Ramauli is a village in West Champaran district in the Indian state of Bihar.

Demographics
As of 2011 India census, Ramauli had a population of 919 in 216 households. Males constitute 50.5% of the population and females 49.4%. Ramauli has an average literacy rate of 41.1%, lower than the national average of 74%: male literacy is 58.73%, and female literacy is 41.26%. In Ramauli, 20% of the population is under 6 years of age.

References

Villages in West Champaran district